Nilesh Jalamkar (born 6 July 1977) is an Indian actor, film director and producer of Marathi films. He has worked in Indian cinema and sometimes acted in well-known movies such as Aasud.

He began his directorial career with the groundbreaking Debu in 2010, and has since delivered many box office hits. Jalamkar's films are known for their technical nuances and fantasy concepts and he is one of the few Indian filmmakers who have made successful films in the fantasy genre.

Career
Jalamkar started his career in Marathi movies with Debu a biopic on the life of Gadge Maharaj and Mahanayak Vasant Tu a biopic on the life of Vasantrao Naik . He has Worked with prominent names like Anu Malik and Sonu Nigam as a Director and a Lyricist. His most notable work is the Multi-starrer Nagpur Adhiveshan with Makarand Anaspure, Mohan Joshi and Chetan Dalvi.His film Satyashodhak  was funded by the Maharashtra Government was a biopic on Jyotiba Phule and Savitribai Phule.
His latest work, Aasud, will be released on 8 February 2019.

Personal life
Nilesh Jalamkar is M.A from Shivaji College, Amravati and B.Ed from Nabira College, Nagpur. He spends most of his time teaching English grammar for MPSC and UPSC students. He dreamed of being a movie creator since childhood. Mr. Jalamkar acted as Pralhad in a play when he was in 4th grade.

Directorial credits

References

External links 
 

Indian male film actors
Male actors in Marathi cinema
Marathi film directors
Living people
Male actors from Mumbai
Film directors from Mumbai
21st-century Indian film directors
21st-century Indian male actors
1977 births